Jack Marston McKelvey (born October 8, 1941) is a bishop of The Episcopal Church, serving in the Diocese of Newark and the Diocese of Rochester.

Biography
McKelvey was ordained deacon in 1966 and priest in 1967. He served as Rector of St. Paul's, Englewood, New Jersey, from 1978 to 1991. In 1991 he was elected Suffragan Bishop of Newark and was consecrated on April 20, 1991, by O'Kelley Whitaker, Bishop of Central New York. On June 19, 1999, he was elected Bishop of Rochester during a special convention in St Thomas' Church in Bath, New York. McKelvey was elected on the fifth ballot. He was installed on December 4, 1999, and started exercising his duties as Bishop of Rochester on January 1, 2000. He retired in 2008.

References 

Living people
1941 births
People from Wilmington, Delaware
Episcopal bishops of Rochester